Colonia Angamos Airport  is an airport serving the village of Colonia Angamos (es) in the Loreto Region of Peru.

Colonia Angamos is a village on the Javary River, a tributary of the Amazon River. The Javary forms part of the boundary between Brazil and Peru.

Airlines and Destinations

See also

Transport in Peru
List of airports in Peru

References

External links
SkyVector - Angamos

Airports in Peru
Buildings and structures in Loreto Region